Aleksandr Gorbachyov may refer to:

 Aleksandr Gorbachyov (footballer, born 1970), Russian football player and coach with FC KAMAZ, FC Dynamo Stavropol, FC Baltika, FC Fakel Voronezh and FC Elista
 Aleksandr Gorbachyov (footballer, born 1986), Russian footballer with FC SKA Rostov who played in Belarus and Finland